The Liberation Rally was a short-lived political organization created after the Egyptian revolution of 1952 to organize popular support for the government. Formed on February 10, 1953, nearly a month after all other parties were outlawed, it supported Pan-Arabism, socialism, and British withdrawal from the Suez Canal. The Rally was dissolved later in the 1950s and replaced by the National Union.

References 
 Helen Chapin Metz, ed. Egypt: A Country Study. Washington: GPO for the Library of Congress, 1990. 
 Encyclopedia of the Modern Middle East and North Africa. 

Political parties established in 1953
Defunct socialist parties in Egypt